Ingo Senftleben (born 10 August 1974) is a German politician of the Christian Democratic Union (CDU).

Early life and career
A trained bricklayer, Senftleben worked at Strabag from 1995 until 1999.

Political career
Senftleben has been a member of the Landtag of Brandenburg since the 1999 state elections. From 2004 until 2009, he chaired the parliament's Committee on Education, Youth and Sports.

On 18 November 2014, Senftleben became leader of the CDU parliamentary group in the Landtag of Brandenburg. On 25 April 2015, he was elected as leader of the CDU of Brandenburg.

In the negotiations to form a coalition government under the leadership of Chancellor Angela Merkel following the 2017 federal elections, Senftleben was part of the working group on energy, climate protection and the environment, led by Armin Laschet, Georg Nüßlein and Barbara Hendricks.

After the poorly outcome of his party in the 2019 Brandenburg state election Senftleben abdicated on 10 September 2019 as party and parliamentary group leader.

Other activities
 Rundfunk Berlin-Brandenburg (RBB), Member of the Broadcasting Council

Political positions
In 2018, Senftleben became the first leading the CDU politician to declare his openness to going into coalition with the nationalist Alternative for Germany (AfD) party.

Personal life
Senftleben is married and has three children.

References

External links 
 

1974 births
Living people
Christian Democratic Union of Germany politicians
Members of the Landtag of Brandenburg
Politicians from Saxony